Walter Merrill Hall (1888 – 1980 in New Rochelle, New York) was an important figure in the American tennis landscape, both as a player and administrator.

As a player, Hall was ranked in the U.S. Top Ten 1911, 1915 and 1918. He won the US Clay Court doubles title in 1912 (with Harold Hackett) and was a runner-up in singles in 1910 and 1913. He reached the quarterfinals at the US National Championships in 1918 and 1919, and at the tournament now known as the Cincinnati Masters he was a singles finalist in 1911 and a quarterfinalist in 1910. 

Hall also won the Middle States singles title three times (1911, 1918 & 1919) and the 1932 New Hampshire state title. 

After he ended his playing career, Hall served the sport as an administrator with the United States Tennis Association as treasurer and then as president (from 1933 to 1936).

References
Wright & Ditson's Lawn Tennis Annual (1911 & 1914); Time Magazine (December 4, 1933); New York Times (August 7, 1980); From Club Court to Center Court by Phillip S. Smith (2008 Edition, page 251).

American male tennis players
Sportspeople from New Rochelle, New York
Tennis people from New York (state)
1888 births
1980 deaths